Michael Postel is a French pharmacologist, Buddhist and art collector, known for his contribution of the art collections to Musée Asiatica, a Biarritz-based museum dedicated to Chinese and Indian art. He is the founder president of Franco-Indian Pharmaceuticals, a drug manufacturing company set up in 1949, which has now grown into pharmaceutical conglomerate. Postel, who reached India in 1949 on business related to his pharmaceutical company, started collecting Indian art and, over the years, gathered a collection of over 1600 pieces. Later, he donated his entire collection to Musee Asiatica. The Government of India awarded him the fourth highest civilian honour of the Padma Shri, in 2016, for his contributions to Art.

See also 
 Indian art

References 

Recipients of the Padma Shri in arts
Year of birth missing (living people)
French art collectors
French pharmacologists
French Buddhists
Living people